Rick Bevan (born in Sydney, New South Wales, Australia) was a professional rugby league footballer in the New South Wales Rugby Football League premiership. He played for the Eastern Suburbs in the 1927 season and was the father of legendary all-time-great  and Hall of Famer Brian Bevan. Rick Bevan was the Eastern Suburbs club's 171st player.

References
 

Australian rugby league players
Sydney Roosters players
Year of birth missing
Year of death missing
Rugby league players from Sydney